The Chief of Armed Forces Training & Procurement (C PROD, sometimes as Chefen för produktionsledningen or Produktionschefen) is a three-star role within the Swedish Armed Forces, responsible the Training & Procurement Staff. The Chief of Armed Forces Training & Procurement is part of the Defence Board (Försvarsmaktsledningen, FML), a group of the Supreme Commander's top commanders.

Organisation
At the Swedish Armed Forces Headquarters's reorganization on 1 April 2007, the Training & Procurement Staff was created. The staff ensures that the Swedish Armed Forces have all the resources required to carry out operations. Its assignments include everything from recruitment and training of personnel to the development of equipment such as weapons, vehicles, ships, and aircraft. The Training & Procurement Staff has a broad area of responsibility which includes both supply of materiel and logistics as well as training of the Swedish Armed Forces' units. The Training & Procurement Staff's assignment is divided between departments with different areas of responsibility, such as the naval and aviation departments. The commanders of these departments are called stridskraftchefer ("combat forces commanders"): the Chief of Army, the Chief of Navy, the Chief of Air Force, the Chief of Defence Logistics, the Chief of Plans (Ledningssystemchefen) and the Chief of Home Guard. The Chief of Armed Forces Training & Procurement reports directly to the Supreme Commander. Sorting under the Chief of Armed Forces Training & Procurement, are all the Swedish Armed Forces' organizational units, i.e. all units, schools and centers, except the headquarters.

Chiefs of Armed Forces Training & Procurement

References

Military appointments of Sweden